Harold Arvit Hamalainen (20 June 1903 – 20 May 1975) was an Australian international rugby union player. Hamalainen played as a lock and claimed a total of three international rugby caps for Australia. He also achieved success in rugby league at an amateur level, representing Brisbane Firsts in 1925–26.

Born in Brisbane, Queensland, Hamalainen was of Finnish descent and a truck driver by profession. During World War II, he enlisted in the Second Australian Imperial Force (2nd AIF) in 1940, before being discharged in 1943.

References

1903 births
1975 deaths
Australian Army personnel of World War II
Australian people of Finnish descent
Australian rugby league players
Australian rugby union players
Australia international rugby union players
Rugby league second-rows
Rugby union locks
Rugby union players from Brisbane